L. americanus may refer to:
 Lathyrus americanus, a vine species in the genus Lathyrus
 Leptoconops americanus, a midge species in the genus Leptoconops
 Leptodus americanus, a brachiopod species in the genus Leptodus
 Lepus americanus, a hare species
 Lethocerus americanus, a toe-biter species
 Lophius americanus, a fish species
 Lotagnostus americanus, a trilobite species
 Lycopus americanus, a wildflower species
 Lysichiton americanus, a cabbage species

See also
 Americanus (disambiguation)